Docks of New Orleans is a 1948 American mystery film directed by Derwin Abrahams and starring Roland Winters, Virginia Dale and Mantan Moreland. It featured Winters in his second appearance as Charlie Chan, having replaced Sidney Toler in the role.

Plot

Cast 
Roland Winters as Charlie Chan
Virginia Dale as Rene Blanchette
Mantan Moreland as Birmingham Brown
John Gallaudet as Capt. Pete McNalley
Victor Sen Yung as Tommy Chan
 Carol Forman as Nita Aguirre
Douglas Fowley as Grock
Harry Hayden as Oscar Swenstrom
Howard Negley as Andre Pereaux
 Stanley Andrews as Theodore Von Scherbe
 Emmett Vogan as	Henri Castanaro
Boyd Irwin as Simon Lafontanne
 Rory Mallinson as 	Thompson
 George J. Lewis as 	Police Sgt. Dansiger
 Ferris Taylor as Dr. Doobie 
 Haywood Jones as 	Mobile Jones
 Dian Fauntelle as 	Mrs. Swenstrom
 Eric Wilton as Watkins the Butler
 Wally Walker as LaFontanne's Chauffeur
 Larry Steers as 	Doctor

References

Bibliography
 Drew, Bernard A. Motion Picture Series and Sequels: A Reference Guide. Routledge, 2013.

External links 

1948 films
Charlie Chan films
American black-and-white films
Films set in New Orleans
Monogram Pictures films
American crime comedy films
1940s crime comedy films
1948 comedy films
Films directed by Derwin Abrahams
1940s English-language films
1940s American films